XFN may refer to:

Cross-functional team, a group of people with different functional expertise
XHTML Friends Network, an HTML microformat
X/Open Federated Naming, most commonly implemented as the Federated Naming Service
Xinhua Financial Network, the blanket term for the companies and services under Xinhua Holdings
IATA code for Xiangyang Liuji Airport